The 2018 Dudley Metropolitan Borough Council election took place on 3 May 2018 to elect members of Dudley Metropolitan Borough Council in England. This was on the same day as other local elections.

Result

Results by ward

Amblecote

Belle Vale

Brierley Hill

Brockmore & Pensnett

Castle & Priory

Coseley East

Cradley & Wollescote

a Kamran Razzaq has been suspended by the Conservative Party and is under investigation due to campaign literature he circulated falsely accusing the Labour Party of being responsible for the spreading of Hepatitis. He will remain on the ballot as a Conservative candidate, but in effect is now an independent.

Gornal

Halesowen North

Halesowen South

Hayley Green & Cradley South

Kingswinford North & Wall Heath

Kingswinford South

Lye & Stourbridge North

Netherton, Woodside & St Andrew's

Norton

Pedmore & Stourbridge East

Quarry Bank & Dudley Wood

Sedgley

St James's

St Thomas's

Upper Gornal & Woodsetton

Wollaston & Stourbridge Town

Wordsley

References

2018 English local elections
2018
2010s in the West Midlands (county)